Meeting of the Waters and similar constructs may refer to:

Meeting of Waters, the confluence of the Rio Negro and Amazon River
The Meeting of the Waters, a sculpture in Aloe Plaza, St Louis
Meeting of the Waters, an Irish park where two rivers meet to form the River Avoca
Meeting-of-the-Waters, an historic house in Franklin, Tennessee
 Meeting of the Waters (EP), by Animal Collective (2017)
The Meeting of the Waters, a 2002 novel by Caiseal Mór

See also
Confluence, discussing the meeting of rivers generally
Confluence Point State Park at the meeting of the Missouri and Mississippi rivers
Point State Park, a park where the Allegheny and Monongahela rivers meet to form the Ohio River
Three Rivers (disambiguation)